Văn Bàn is a rural district of Lào Cai province in the Northeastern region of Vietnam. As of 2019, the district had a population of 89,167. The district covers an area of 1,444 km². The district capital lies at Khánh Yên.

The district is located in the southern part of the province, on the right bank of the Red River.

Administrative divisions
Văn Bàn is officially divided into 22 commune-level sub-divisions, including the township of Khánh Yên and 21 rural communes (Chiềng Ken, Dần Thàng, Dương Quỳ, Hòa Mạc, Khánh Yên Hạ, Khánh Yên Thượng, Khánh Yên Trung, Làng Giàng, Liêm Phú, Minh Lương, Nậm Chày, Nậm Mả, Nậm Dạng, Nậm Tha, Nậm Xây, Nậm Xé, Sơn Thủy, Tân An, Tân Thượng, Thẩm Dương, Võ Lao).

References

Districts of Lào Cai province
Lào Cai province